Carlos Avendaño Calvo (born 23 November 1955) is a Costa Rican politician as well as an Evangelical pastor and theologian. He is the founder of the National Restoration Party.

Born San José, Avendaño holds a theological degree form IBAD. Since 1993 Avendaño has been a pastor with the Assemblies of God denomination.

On 5 February 2005 Avendaño founded the National Restoration Party after he resigned as the deputy of Costa Rican Renewal Party because of differences with the parties chairman Justo Orozco. Having already served a term in the Costa Rican assembly representing the Renewal Party, Avendaño was elected to another term in 2010 representing the National Restoration Party. Orozco and Avendaño put their differences aside and the former endorsed that latter for the party's candidate in the Costa Rican presidential election of 2014, as Avendaño received 1.35 percent of the vote.

Avendaño is known for his conservative positions on social issues, such as his opposition to civil unions, same-sex marriage, in vitro fertilization and abortion.

References

1955 births
Living people
People from San José, Costa Rica
Costa Rican evangelicals
Costa Rican clergy
Assemblies of God pastors
Members of the Legislative Assembly of Costa Rica
Costa Rican anti-same-sex-marriage activists